Phantasmiella is a genus of fruit flies in the family Tephritidae.  It is considered a synonym of Soita.

References

Trypetinae